Teratophyllum is a genus of ferns in the family Dryopteridaceae, subfamily Elaphoglossoideae, in the Pteridophyte Phylogeny Group classification of 2016 (PPG I). The genus is native to Malesia.

Taxonomy
Teratophyllum was attributed to Georg Heinrich Mettenius when it was first published by Friedrich Kuhn in 1869. The genus is recognized in the PPG I classification, and by the Checklist of Ferns and Lycophytes of the World. , Plants of the World Online also recognized the genus, but with a wider circumscription that included Arthrobotrya.

Species
, the Checklist of Ferns and Lycophytes of the World recognized the following species:
Teratophyllum aculeatum (Blume) Mett. ex Kuhn
Teratophyllum arthropteroides (Christ) Holttum
Teratophyllum clemensiae Holttum
Teratophyllum gracile (Blume) Holttum
Teratophyllum hainanense S.Y.Dong & X.C.Zhang
Teratophyllum koordersii Holttum
Teratophyllum leptocarpum (Fée) Holttum
Teratophyllum ludens (Fée) Holttum
Teratophyllum luzonicum Holttum
Teratophyllum rotundifoliatum (R.Bonap.) Holttum

References

Dryopteridaceae
Fern genera